Edelweiss Broking Limited is an Indian Financial services company based in Mumbai, India. The company is a subsidiary of Edelweiss Group which was founded by Rashesh Shah. The company is registered with National Stock Exchange of India, Bombay Stock Exchange and MCX Stock Exchange. The company identification number (CIN) is U65100GJ2008PLC077462. It acts as a mutual fund distributor and has AMFI Registration Number - 70892.

History 
Edelweiss Broking limited was publicly incorporated on 7 February 2008 after Edelweiss Group had received final regulatory approval from the Securities and Exchange Board of India (SEBI) to start its mutual fund business by 2008. The Stockbroker acquired retail broker Anagram Capital Limited in Jan 2010. On 12 December 2012 the company was listed under National stock Exchange with registration number INE231311631. It was listed in MCX Stock Exchange Limited with a registration number INE261311634.

References 

Financial services companies based in Mumbai
2008 establishments in Maharashtra
Indian companies established in 2008
Financial services companies established in 2008